Mell Elizabeth Reasco González (born 23 July 2002), known as Mell Reasco, is an Ecuadorian tennis player.

Career
Reasco has a career high ITF juniors ranking of 34, achieved on 20 May 2019.

Reasco made her Fed Cup debut for Ecuador in 2019.

ITF Circuit finals

Singles: 1 (1 titles)

Doubles: 2 runners–ups

Notes

References

External links
  
 
 
 

2002 births
Living people
Ecuadorian female tennis players
Tennis players at the 2019 Pan American Games
Pan American Games competitors for Ecuador
21st-century Ecuadorian women
Georgia Lady Bulldogs tennis players